SVL or Scientific Vector Language is a programming language created by Chemical Computing Group. It was first released in 1994. SVL is the built-in command, scripting and application development language of MOE. It is a "chemistry aware" computer programming language with over 1,000 specific functions for analyzing and manipulating chemical structures and related molecular objects. SVL is a concise, high-level language whose programs are typically 10 times smaller than their equivalent when compared to C or Fortran. SVL source code is compiled to a "byte code" representation, which is then executed by the base run-time environment making SVL programs inherently portable across different computer hardware and operating systems.

References

External links
 Programming with SVL Vectors
 Chemical Computing Group SVL Exchange
 Overview of SVL from Scientific Computing World

Programming languages
Research support companies
Software companies of Canada

Software companies established in 1994
Canadian companies established in 1994